The Interamerican Society of Psychology is an organization representing the interests of psychologists throughout the Americas. It is more commonly known by its Spanish title Sociedad Interamericana de Psicología (SIP). It is also known by its French title Société Interaméricaine de Psychologie. The organization's official languages are Spanish, English, Portuguese, and French.

Every two years the SIP hosts the Interamerican Congress of Psychology (CIP) and the Regional Congress of Psychology (CR-SIP). Their first Interamerican Congress was celebrated in 1953 in Santo Domingo, Dominican Republic.

History
The organization was founded in Mexico City by a group of behavioral scientists on December 17, 1951. The founding members consisted of a group of psychologists and psychiatrists that were assisting the IV International Congress for mental health in the same city. Some of their founding members were:
Eduardo Krapf from Argentina, as President.
Werner Wolff from the United States, as Vice-president.
Osvaldo Robles from Mexico, as Secretary-General.

The purpose of founding this Society was to encourage exchange at the academic, professional, and scientific levels between countries on the American continent.  The SIP is a member of the International Union of Psychological Science (IUPsyS), a division of the International Council of Scientific Unions.

The leadership of SIP includes members from North, Central, and South America and the Caribbean.

Publications
Its premier publication is the Interamerican Journal of Psychology 

(Revista Interamericana de Psicología).

References
 

Organizations established in 1951
Psychology organizations